Tau Airport  was a privately owned, private-use airport located  southeast of the village of Ta‘ū on the island of Ta‘ū in American Samoa, an unincorporated territory of the United States. The airport was located in the northwest corner of Ta‘ū island. Tau Airport was deactivated in 1990, and was replaced by Fitiuta Airport, located on the northeast side of the island. Satellite imagery from 2015 does not appear to show any remnants of the airport.

Facilities and aircraft 
The runway surface was compacted coral in the center , with the rest of runway composed of dirt and grass.

According to the last issued FAA data, for 12-month period ending March 8, 1989, the airport had 4,380 aircraft operations, an average of 12 per day: 67% general aviation and 33% air taxi.

References

External links 
 National Park Service map of the Manu‘a Islands showing location of Ta‘ū village on the island of Ta‘ū.
 Resources for this airport:
 
 

Defunct airports in the United States
Airports in American Samoa